The men's middleweight boxing event at the 2020 Summer Olympics is scheduled to take place between 26 July and 7 August 2021 at the Ryōgoku Kokugikan. 25 boxers from 25 nations are expected to compete.

Background
This will be the 26th appearance of the men's middleweight event. The event appeared at the first Olympic boxing tournament in 1904 and has been held at every Games with boxing (that is, excluding 1912) since. The middleweight class remains at the 69–75 kg range it has used since the 2004 Games.

Reigning World Champion Gleb Bakshi of Russia has qualified for the Games. The 2016 Olympic champion, Arlen López of Cuba, has moved up to the light-heavyweight class for the 2020 Games.

Qualification

A National Olympic Committee (NOC) could enter only 1 qualified boxer in the weight class. There were 24 quota places available for the men's middleweight, allocated as follows:

 1 place for the host nation, Japan.
 3 places at the 2020 African Boxing Olympic Qualification Tournament.
 5 places at the 2020 Asia & Oceania Boxing Olympic Qualification Tournament.
 6 places at the 2020 European Boxing Olympic Qualification Tournament.
 4 places that were intended to be awarded at the 2021 Pan American Boxing Olympic Qualification Tournament, which was cancelled. These places were instead awarded through the world ranking list to the top boxers from the Americas who had been registered for the qualification tournament.
 4 places that were intended to be awarded at a World Olympic Qualifying Tournament, which was cancelled. These places were instead awarded through the world ranking list, with one place for each continental zone (Africa, Asia & Oceania, Europe, Americas).
 1 place for a Tripartite Commission invitation.

In addition, a Refugee Olympic Team invitation was made to Eldric Sella, bringing the total number of boxers in the class to 25.

Competition format
Like all Olympic boxing events, the competition is a straight single-elimination tournament. The competition begins with a preliminary round, where the number of competitors is reduced to 16, and concludes with a final. As there are fewer than 32 boxers in the competition, a number of boxers will receive a bye through the preliminary round. Both semifinal losers are awarded bronze medals.

Bouts consist of three three-minute rounds with a one-minute break between rounds. A boxer may win by knockout or by points. Scoring is on the "10-point-must" system, with 5 judges scoring each round. Judges consider "number of blows landed on the target areas, domination of the bout, technique and tactical superiority and competitiveness." Each judge determines a winner for each round, who receives 10 points for the round, and assigns the round's loser a number of points between 7 and 9 based on performance. The judge's scores for each round are added to give a total score for that judge. The boxer with the higher score from a majority of the judges is the winner.

Schedule
The middleweight starts with the round of 32 on 26 July. There are two rest days before the round of 16 on 29 July, then two more rest days before the quarterfinals on 1 August. After that, there are three rest days before the semifinals on 5 August but only one before the final on 7 August.

Results

Finals

Top half

Bottom half

References

External links
Draw 

Boxing at the 2020 Summer Olympics
Men's events at the 2020 Summer Olympics